Matthäus Apelles von Löwenstern (20 April 1594 – 11 April 1648) was a German psalmist, musician and statesman.

Life 
He was born in Prudnik as Matthäus Apelt. His father was a saddler. He studied at the university of Frankfurt. He directed the music of the church at Prudnik. In 1625, he was named musical director and treasurer to Duke Heinrich Wenzel of Münsterberg. The following year, he became rector of a school, and in 1631, he was admitted to the Duke's government. He sat in the governments of Emperors Ferdinand II and Ferdinand III. He became part of the nobility of Ferdinand II, and this was confirmed by Ferdinand III.

Löwenstern wrote thirty psalms, of which many were translated to other languages. He also published the psalm collection Früelings-Mayen in 1644. He has one psalm in the Norsk Salmebok and Norsk salmebok 2013.

See also 
 Lord of Our Life and God of Our Salvation
 For the Lord reigneth

References

Literature 
 Anne Kristin Aasmundtveit, Biografisk leksikon til Norsk Salmebok og Norsk Koralbok, Verbum forlag, Oslo, 1995. . Side 38-39.

External links 

 Matthäus Appelles von Löwenstern (Hymn-Writer, Composer), bach-cantatas.com

German Lutheran hymnwriters
People from Prudnik
1594 births
1648 deaths
17th-century German composers